The women's 200 metre backstroke competition of the swimming events at the 2011 World Aquatics Championships was held on July 29 with the heats and the semifinals and July 30 with the final.

The final was won by sixteen-year-old American Missy Franklin in a time of 2:05.10.  Frankin's time was the third-fastest ever in the event, only behind Zimbabwean Kirsty Coventry (2:04.81) and Russian Anastasia Zuyeva (2:04.94).

Records
Prior to the competition, the existing world and championship record were as follows.

Results

Heats
39 swimmers participated in 6 heats.

Semifinals
The semifinals were held at 19:12.

Semifinal 1

Semifinal 2

Final
The final was held at 18:33.

References

External links
2011 World Aquatics Championships: Women's 200 metre backstroke start list, from OmegaTiming.com; retrieved 2011-07-23.
FINA World Championships, Swimming: Missy Franklin Unstoppable in 200 Back Win; Crushes Textile Best, American Record, Swimming World Magazine (2011-07-30); retrieved 2011-08-10.

Backstroke 200 metre, women's
World Aquatics Championships
2011 in women's swimming